Camp Manor Apartments is a historic apartment building located at Springfield, Greene County, Missouri. It was built in 1916, and is a three-story building of wood-frame construction with a red brick and wood exterior. The building features a stepped parapet with limestone cap and ornate limestone brick cornice at the roofline.

It was listed on the National Register of Historic Places in 2005.

References

Residential buildings on the National Register of Historic Places in Missouri
Residential buildings completed in 1916
Buildings and structures in Springfield, Missouri
National Register of Historic Places in Greene County, Missouri